William Paxton Bishop  (July 16, 1918 – October 3, 1959) was an American television and movie actor from Oak Park, Illinois.

Early life
Bishop was the son of Edward T. Bishop and Helen MacArthur Bishop. He had a brother, Robert. His elementary and secondary schooling came in New York and New Jersey. He went to West Virginia University where he wanted to study law but left to enter theater. While he was at WVU, Bishop "won laurels as a football player and in other athletics."

His uncle was playwright Charles MacArthur, making him the nephew of stage and screen legend Helen Hayes and the cousin of actor James MacArthur.

Military service
Bishop served in the South Pacific with a Signal Battalion of the United States Army during World War II.

Stage
Bishop's early experiences in acting came on the stage. After some work in little theaters in New York, he appeared on Broadway in Tobacco Road. He was also a charter member of Orson Welles' Mercury Theatre.

Television and film
Bishop was best known for his role as Steve Connors on the 1950s NBC comedy series It's a Great Life He was also seen in other programs, including Schlitz Playhouse of Stars and The Loretta Young Show.

He had roles in films including Harriet Craig, The Killer That Stalked New York and The Basketball Fix, plus numerous westerns such as Top Gun, The Tougher They Come, Gun Belt,  Cripple Creek and Wyoming Renegades.

Personal life
In 1956, Bishop married Shirley Mohr "in a small Nevada town after being marooned ... by blizzard."

Death
Bishop died in Malibu, California of cancer on October 3, 1959, at age 41.

Selected filmography

Pilot No. 5 (1943) - Cadet (uncredited)
Young Ideas (1943) - French Lieutenant (uncredited)
Salute to the Marines (1943) - Cpl. Anderson (uncredited)
Swing Shift Maisie (1943) - Young Pilot (uncredited)
I Dood It (1943) - Detective (uncredited)
Soldier with Autograph Book (uncredited)Cry 'Havoc' (1943) - Soldier (uncredited)Swing Fever (1943) - Radio Man (uncredited)Lost Angel (1943) - Reporter (uncredited)A Guy Named Joe (1943) - Ray - Transport Pilot (uncredited)Whistling in Brooklyn (1943) - Psychiatrist (uncredited)The Beginning or the End (1947) - 2nd Lieutenant - Electronics Officer, Enola Gay (uncredited)The Romance of Rosy Ridge (1947) - Ad BuchananSong of the Thin Man (1947) - Al AmboyDevil Ship (1947) - SandersonAdventures in Silverado (1948) - Bill FossPort Said (1948) - Leslie SearsCoroner Creek (1948) - Leach Conover
 Thunderhoof (1948) - The KidBlack Eagle (1948) - Jason BondThe Untamed Breed (1948) - Larch KeeganSlightly French (1949) - J.B. (voice, uncredited)The Walking Hills (1949) - Dave 'Shep' WilsonAnna Lucasta (1949) - Rudolf StrobelMr. Soft Touch (1949) - Radio Broadcaster (voice, uncredited)The Killer That Stalked New York (1950)  - Dr. Ben WoodHarriet Craig (1950) - Wes MillerThe Tougher They Come (1950) - Gus WilliamsThe Frogmen (1951) - Ferrino (uncredited)Lorna Doone (1951) - Carver DooneThe Texas Rangers (1951) - Sam BassThe Basketball Fix (1951) - Mike TaftMontana Territory (1952) - Opening Off-Screen Narrator (uncredited)Cripple Creek (1952) - Silver KirbyBreakdown (1952) - Terry WilliamsThe Raiders (1952) - Marshal William HendersonThe Redhead from Wyoming (1953) - Jim AverellGun Belt (1953) - Ike ClintonOverland Pacific (1954) - Del StewartWyoming Renegades (1955) - SundanceTop Gun (1955) - Canby JuddThe Boss (1956) - Bob HerrickThe White Squaw (1956) - Bob GarthThe Phantom Stagecoach (1957) - Glen HaydenShort Cut to Hell (1957) - Sgt. Stan LoweryThe Oregon Trail'' (1959) - Capt. George Wayne

References

External links
 
 
 

1918 births
1959 deaths
Male actors from Illinois
American male television actors
20th-century American male actors
Deaths from cancer in California
West Virginia University alumni
Burials at Woodlawn Memorial Cemetery, Santa Monica